Winona is a city in Montgomery County, Mississippi, United States. The population was 5,043 at the 2010 census. It is the county seat of Montgomery County.
Winona is known in the local area as "The Crossroads of North Mississippi"; the intersection of U.S. Interstate 55 and U.S. Highways 51 and 82 were constructed here.

History

Middleton 
Middleton, Mississippi was a town that developed in the 19th century two miles west of Winona's site. Some locals consider it the predecessor to Winona. After the railroad was built to the east of Middleton, development shifted to what became Winona, bypassing Middleton.

Winona 
The first European-American settler in the area, which was originally part of Carroll County, was Colonel O.J. Moore, who arrived from Virginia in 1848. He agreed to the railroad being constructed through his property, and a station was built in 1860 near his plantation home.

As a result of the railroad line and station being built here rather than Middleton, Winona was founded and began to grow. The railroad attracted business, which developed around the station as Moore sold off some property. Winona was incorporated as a town on May 2, 1861. Settlers were attracted because of the railroad access, and Winona became a busy trading town.

Captain William Witty, an early settler from North Carolina, was for years a leading Winona merchant and established the first bank in the county. Other names of early settlers were: Curtis, Burton, Palmer, Spivey, Townsend, Hart, Turner and Campbell. The early businesses were mainly grocery stores.

In 1871, the Reconstruction-era state legislature organized Montgomery County from portions of Carroll and other counties, and Winona was designated as its county seat. A yellow fever epidemic struck the area in 1878, and resulted in the deaths of many residents. Some people left the town in an effort to outrun the epidemic, which spread with river passengers throughout the waterways of the Mississippi Delta and nearby counties.

In April 1888, a great fire destroyed almost the entire business section of the town. Forty of the 50 businesses burned. In 1890 the state passed a new constitution that effectively disenfranchised most blacks, excluding them from the political system. In addition, Jim Crow laws were passed imposing second-class status on them, a condition enforced by whites for decades.

20th century to present
Following their service in World War II, many African Americans began to press to regain their constitutional rights. Activism increased in the South into the 1950s and 1960s.

Many whites in Winona and elsewhere in Mississippi opposed such changes. In 1963, Fannie Lou Hamer and other state activists stopped to eat in Winona on their way to a literacy workshop in Charleston, South Carolina. On June 9, 1963, Hamer and the other activists stopped again in Winona on their return. The group was arrested on a false charge and jailed by white policemen. Once in jail, Hamer and her colleagues were, per orders of local law officers, beaten savagely by inmates of the Montgomery County jail, almost to the point of death.

While touring the country in this period, the Rev. Martin Luther King Jr., head of the Southern Christian Leadership Conference (SCLC), made a stop in Winona. He was ambushed by local barber Ryan Lynch, an outspoken white supremacist. King was saved by his assigned bodyguard, a local police officer named Garrit Howard.

In 1996, the owner of the Tardy Furniture store in Winona, Bertha Tardy, and three employees of the store were found fatally shot. Curtis Flowers was arrested in January 1997 and charged with four counts of capital murder.  Flowers was tried a total of six times, and in 2020, the Office of the Attorney General filed a motion to dismiss the charges.

Geography 

Climate

Demographics

2020 census

As of the 2020 United States census, there were 4,505 people, 1,696 households, and 1,223 families residing in the city.

2010 census
As of the 2010 United States Census, there were 5,043 people living in the city. 52.8% were Black or African American, 45.8% White, 0.6% Asian, 0.2% Native American, 0.2% of some other race and 0.4% of two or more races. 0.5% were Hispanic or Latino (of any race).

2000 census
As of the census of 2000, there were 5,482 people, 2,098 households, and 1,456 families living in the city. The racial makeup of the city was 48.10% White, 50.73% African American, 0.15% Native American, 0.49% Asian, 0.05% Pacific Islander, 0.04% from other races, and 0.44% from two or more races. Hispanic or Latino of any race were 0.89% of the population.

There were 2,098 households, out of which 32.9% had children under the age of 18 living with them, 41.5% were married couples living together, 24.3% had a female householder with no husband present, and 30.6% were non-families. 28.6% of all households were made up of individuals, and 15.2% had someone living alone who was 65 years of age or older. The average household size was 2.55 and the average family size was 3.14.

In the city, the population was spread out, with 27.9% under the age of 18, 9.1% from 18 to 24, 24.1% from 25 to 44, 20.8% from 45 to 64, and 18.1% who were 65 years of age or older. The median age was 37 years. For every 100 females, there were 78.1 males. For every 100 females age 18 and over, there were 70.2 males.

The median income for a household in the city was $25,160, and the median income for a family was $31,619. Males had a median income of $30,163 versus $17,549 for females. The per capita income for the city was $14,700. About 24.5% of families and 27.4% of the population were below the poverty line, including 40.6% of those under age 18 and 24.8% of those age 65 or over.

Economy 
In May 2005, the economy of Winona got a slight boost with the arrival of Pilot Travel Centers. The company, a large truck-stop/travel-center chain, purchased the High Point truck and travel center, previously owned by former NFL player Kent Hull, for a reported $4.6 million. After a lengthy renovation, the plaza opened completely in August 2005, just a few days before Hurricane Katrina hit land. 

In January 2021, Biewer Lumber  announced its plan to develop a state-of-the-art sawmill in Winona.  As a reported $130 million investment, the company intends to bring more than 150 new jobs to Montgomery County.

Education

Public schools
 Winona- Montgomery County Consolidated School District
 Winona Vocational Complex

Private schools
 Winona Christian School

Media

Newspaper
 The Winona Times

Radio stations

Notable people 
 William Billingsley, Naval pilot
 Little Sammy Davis, blues musician
 Jane Holmes Dixon, Episcopal Bishop of Washington Pro-Tempore
 Chris Faser Jr., member of the Mississippi House of Representatives while living in Winona in the 1950s; later a member of the Louisiana House of Representatives; aide to Louisiana Governor Jimmie Davis in both the 1944 and 1959 campaigns
 Wade Griffin, NFL football player
 E. W. Hammons, film producer
 Frank W. Hunger, former United States Assistant Attorney General
 L. C. McKinley, Chicago blues guitarist
 Donald H. Peterson, astronaut
 Gil Peterson, actor
 Roebuck Staples, Gospel and R&B musician
 William V. Sullivan, United States Senator and lynch mob leader
 James Michael Tyler, actor
 Chris White, NFL football player

References

External links

 

Cities in Mississippi
Cities in Montgomery County, Mississippi
County seats in Mississippi
1861 establishments in Mississippi
Mississippi placenames of Native American origin